Gaetano Perego (died 1783) was an Italian painter active in Northern Italy.

Few biographical details are known about this painter. He worked in the Sanctuary of Vicoforte in preparation for the wedding of Victor Amadeus III of Savoy and Maria Antonietta of Bourbon in 1750. In 1753–1780, he helped decorate the Carignano theater in Turin, and the Hunting Lodge of Stupinigi. He married the daughter of the painter Vittorio Amedeo Cignaroli. Perego died in Turin.

Bibliography
 Luigi Mallè. Stupinigi. Tipografia torinese editrice, 1968.
 Translated from Italian Wikipedia entry

1700s births
1783 deaths
18th-century Italian painters
Italian male painters
Painters from Piedmont
18th-century Italian male artists